Sebou (Berber: Asif en Sbu) is a river in northern Morocco.  At its source in the Middle Atlas mountains it is known as the Guigou River (Berber: Asif n Gigu).  The river is 496 kilometers long and has an average water flow of 137 m3/s, which makes it the largest North African river by volume. It passes near the city of Fes and discharges to the Atlantic Ocean at Mehdya. Sebou is navigable for only 16 km as far as the city of Kenitra, which has the only river port in Morocco. Its most important tributaries are the Ouergha River, Baht River and Inaouen River. The river supports irrigation in Morocco's most fertile region: the Gharb.

History
Sebou was known in antiquity as Sububus. Pliny the Elder states that it was "magnificus et navigabilis" (grand and navigable), flowing near the towns of Banasa (near the city of Mechra Bel Ksiri) and Thamusida.

There is scant historical reference to the Sebou being used for navigation after the Islamic conquest; nevertheless, its river mouth was an important harbor and shipyard in the Almohad period.

In 1669–1670, the Alaouite sultan Moulay Rashid built a bridge over the river near Fes which has been preserved today.

During the precolonial period, the Sebou was renowned for its Twait shad which was highly prized by the people of Fez, but due to pollution the shad became extinct on the Sebou.

In the first years of the French protectorate an expedition successfully navigated the Sebou from Sidi Ali Ben Sliman to the city of Fez on a small steam boat Le Dantec.

Environmental issues
A number of water pollutants enter the Sebou River, notably including pesticides and fertilisers from agricultural runoff and untreated sewage from towns along the river.

See also
 Idriss I (dam)

References

Rivers of Morocco